Cottonworld is a natural clothing brand with 31 stores across India. Their head office is based in Mumbai. The brand's products are made from natural fabrics like cotton, linen, modal, Tencel, and viscose.

History

Early History

Cottonworld traces its origins to 1987. After an idea to use the excess fabric to make quality cotton shirts, the Lekhraj family established a garment export-manufacturing unit. The items would be put on sale and sold quickly at a time when cotton clothing was not considered fashionable. The success prompted the family to open their first store with just a few garments on display and later the response proved to be positive.

Cottonworld is dedicated to natural clothing. Set up in Colaba, Mumbai, the brand has grown and spread its branches throughout the country with 31 stores across India, shifting from manufacturing to retail over time.

By using sustainable fibers, Cottonworld intends to make good use of its resources, from recycling clothes to reusing fabric, including tracking their clothes from farms to factories.

Indian Farmers

The increase in farmers’ suicides is the most tragic symptom of the survival crisis faced by Indian cotton farmers. CVWOW 2030 aims to help Indian organic cotton farmers by using organic cotton and helping the community from proceeds through the sale of Happy T's.

Planet

By 2050, the world will consume three planets' worth of resources annually. To make a difference, they have committed to using recycled materials and sustainable fabrics, wherever possible.

Made In India

From the production of clothes to the use of resources, factories, and supply chains are all made in India.

Initiatives and collaboration

Adopt A Tree campaign

Every garment at Cottonworld comes with a tag that is embedded with seeds.

Using eco-friendly tags for their clothing

Cottonworld works with El Rhino, a foundation dedicated to using elephant and rhino poop to produce handmade paper.

Eco handbags

Cottonworld introduced eco-chic reusable tote bags made of vintage bedsheets, replacing the standard plastic shopping handbags. These bags are made in affiliation with CRY foundation, an NGO working for the benefit of underprivileged children.

T-shirts for Being Human Foundation

Cottonworld teamed up with Being Human - the Salman Khan Foundation - to design T-shirts inspired by the foundation.

Products

Cottonworld stores have a wide range of men's and women's clothing, including ethnic wear and yoga wear for women.

References

Adopt a Tree Campaign

Initiatives

External links
Official website

1987 establishments in Maharashtra
Retail companies established in 1987